Van Marcke or Vanmarcke is a surname. Notable people with the surname include:

Anna Van Marcke (1924–2012), Belgian sprint canoer
Émile van Marcke (1827–1890), French painter
Sep Vanmarcke (born 1988), Belgian cyclist

Surnames of Dutch origin